The 2011–12 Liga Premier de Ascenso season was split in two tournaments Apertura and Clausura. Liga Premier was the third-tier football league of Mexico. The season was played between 12 August 2011 and 20 May 2012.

Teams

Group 1

Group 2 
{{Location map+ |Mexico |width=700|float=right |caption=Location of teams in the 2011–12 LPA Group 2 |places=

Torneo Apertura

Regular season

Group 1

Standings

Results

Group 2

Standings

Results

Liguilla
The eight best teams of each group play two games against each other on a home-and-away basis. The higher seeded teams play on their home field during the second leg. The winner of each match up is determined by aggregate score. In the Round of 8, quarterfinals and semifinals, if the two teams are tied on aggregate the higher seeded team advances. In the final, if the two teams are tied after both legs, the match goes to extra time and, if necessary, a penalty shoot-out.

Round of 16

First leg

Second leg

Quarter-finals

First leg

Second leg

Semi-finals

First leg

Second leg

Final

First leg

Second leg

Torneo Clausura

Regular season

Group 1

Standings

Results

Group 2

Standings

Results

Liguilla
The eight best teams of each group play two games against each other on a home-and-away basis. The higher seeded teams play on their home field during the second leg. The winner of each match up is determined by aggregate score. In the Round of 8, quarterfinals and semifinals, if the two teams are tied on aggregate the higher seeded team advances. In the final, if the two teams are tied after both legs, the match goes to extra time and, if necessary, a penalty shoot-out.

Round of 16

First leg

Second leg

Quarter-finals

First leg

Second leg

Semi-finals

First leg

Second leg

Final

First leg

Second leg

Relegation Table 

Last updated: 22 April 2012 Source: Liga Premier FMFP = Position; G = Games played; Pts = Points; Pts/G = Ratio of points to games played

Promotion to Ascenso MX
Titanes de Tulancingo won both tournaments of the season, so at first it had the right to be promoted to Ascenso MX, however, the team did not meet the membership requirements and had to give up its site to another club. Finally, the league granted the ticket to the superior category to Tecamachalco, however, this team had to undergo a restructuring process to be able to compete in the 2013–14 season, finally, this gave rise to the birth of the club Alebrijes de Oaxaca.

See also 
2011–12 Mexican Primera División season
2011–12 Liga de Ascenso season
2011–12 Liga de Nuevos Talentos season

References

External links 
 Official website of Liga Premier
 Magazine page 

 
1